Timber floating may refer to:

Log driving
Timber rafting